Tomasz Konina (23 June 1972 – 26 August 2017) was a Polish theatre and opera director and stage designer.

Biography 
Born in Warsaw, Poland in 1972, Konina graduated from the National Academy of Dramatic Art in Warsaw in 1996.

He made both his theatre and opera debut in 1998: Chekhov's Uncle Vanya at the Teatr Ateneum in Warsaw and Mozart's Marriage of Figaro at the Wrocław Opera.

In 2002 he was granted the scholarship of Vilar Young Artists Programme (presently: Jette Parker Young Artists Programme) at the Royal Opera House Covent Garden in London.

Graduate of the University of Economics in Wrocław (Managerial Postgraduate Studies on Business Management, Institute of Contemporary Management, at the Faculty of Management, 2013).

From 2007 to 2015 he was the artistic and executive director of the Jan Kochanowski Dramatic Theater in Opole.

Opera, operetta and music productions 
 2000 – Rossini's Tancredi, Polish National Opera in Warsaw (with Ewa Podleś in title role, under music direction of Alberto Zedda)
 2001 – Boito's Mefistofele, Opera Nova in Bydgoszcz
 2002 – Beethoven's Fidelio, Grand Theatre, Poznań
 2004 – Cilea's Adriana Lecouvreur, Grand Theatre, Łódź
 2005 – Verdi's Macbeth, Grand Theatre, Łódź
 2005 – Lehar's The Merry Widow, Music Theatre in Łódź
 2006 – Verdi's La traviata, Wrocław Opera
 2007 – Be like Callas (based on own scenario), Music Theatre in Łódź
 2013 – Verdi's Falstaff, Grand Theatre, Poznań
 2014 – Boito's Mefistofele, Cracow Opera
 2015 – Strauss's The Gypsy Baron, Grand Theatre, Łódź
 2015 – Boito's Mefistofele z Trondheim Symphony Orchestra
 2017 – Verdi's La forza del destino, Silesian Opera, Bytom

Konina directed many works which had never been staged in Poland before:
 2002 – Debussy's Pelléas and Mélisande, Polish National Opera, Warsaw
 2003 – Rossini's Il viaggio a Reims, Polish National Opera, Warsaw (with Ewa Podleś as Marchesa Melibea, under music direction of Alberto Zedda)
 2005 – Ullmann's The Emperor of Atlantis, Warsaw Chamber Opera
 2005 – Bernstein's Candide, Grand Theatre, Łódź
 2010 – Ptaszynska's The Lovers From the Valldemosa Monastery, Grand Theatre, Łódź

Theatre productions 
 2001 – Suassuna's A Dog's Will, Cyprian Kamil Norwid Theatre in Jelenia Góra
 2008 – Schimmelphennig's For a Better World, Jan Kochanowski Dramatic Theater in Opole
 2008 – Chekhov's The Cherry Orchard, Jan Kochanowski Dramatic Theater in Opole
 2009 – Dumas's The Lady of the Camellias, Jan Kochanowski Dramatic Theater in Opole
 2009 – Dostoevsky's The Idiot, Jan Kochanowski Dramatic Theater in Opole
 2009 – Iwaszkiewicz's The Maids of Wilko, Jan Kochanowski Dramatic Theater in Opole
 2010 – Andersen's The Snow Queen, Jan Kochanowski Dramatic Theater in Opole
 2013 – Lewis's The Lion, the Witch and the Wardrobe, Jan Kochanowski Dramatic Theater in Opole
 2014 – Andersen's The Snow Queen, Teatr Polski in Warsaw

Other 
As a manager, he initiated cooperation with a number of important theatre festivals:
 Shakespeare's Globe in London
 Seoul Performing Arts Festival in Korea
 Tbilisi International Festival of Theatre in Georgia
 La MaMa Experimental Theatre Club in New York
 The Studio Players in Istanbul
 Teatr International Festival Minsk in Belarus
 Istanbul Theatre Festival in Turkey
 Uijeongbu International Music Theatre Festival in Korea
 Eurothalia Theatre Festival Timișoara in Romania
As director of the theatre in Opole he invited the cooperation of many famous artists like: Agnieszka Holland, Maja Kleczewska, Aleksandra Konieczna, Monika Strzępka, Jacek Poniedziałek,  and many others.

Sources 
 Tomasz Konina in Polish Theatre Encyclopedia
 Tomasz Konina in e-teatr.pl
 Portal Operabase – list of Tomasz Konina opera productions
 List of Tomasz Konina productions in Polish National Opera Archives
 Portrait of Tomasz Konina in Dziennik Teatralny (first Polish theatre portal)
 Scores written by geniuses are always contemporary – conversation with Tomasz Konina (English version), Trubadur, 3(20)/2001

References

External links 
 
 Tomasz Konina's profile of Trulinked / Classical Music
 

Polish opera directors
People from Warsaw
Polish theatre directors
1972 births
2017 deaths